"The Girl of My Best Friend" is a song written by Sam Bobrick and Beverly Ross and first released in 1959 by Charlie Blackwell as the B-side to his single "Choppin' Mountains". It was later recorded by Marty Vine in 1960. It was made famous as a cover by Elvis Presley with The Jordanaires in 1960, the song peaked at No.9 in the U.K. singles chart (in 1976).  It has also been covered by Ral Donner in 1960 (No.19 U.S.), Johnny Burnette in 1962 and by Bryan Ferry for his 1993 covers album Taxi. A dance hall version was also released as a single in the 1990 by Tippa Irie and Peter Spence on GT's Records and Mango.

Content
The singer is secretly and hopelessly in love with his best friend's girl. He describes the girl's features, attributes, and the love she and his friend shares. The singer wants the girl to know about his feelings for her, but can't bring himself to tell her for fear that she would become offended and he would be shunned by both her and his friend. He hopes his "aching heart" mends someday and he finds a love of his own, with similar features and personality as his best friend's girl.

Chart positions

References

Elvis Presley songs
1959 songs
Songs written by Beverly Ross
RCA Victor singles
The Crickets songs